Eugene Leo Derfler (born May 24, 1924) is an American politician who was a member of the Oregon House of Representatives and Oregon State Senate. He is an alumnus of Western Washington College of Education and the Pensocola Naval Aviator School. He was a real estate broker at Coldwell Banker Mountain West Real Estate.

References

1924 births
Living people
Republican Party members of the Oregon House of Representatives
Politicians from Portland, Oregon
Politicians from Salem, Oregon
United States Navy personnel of World War II
Western Washington University alumni